KFTM (1400 AM, "Hometown Radio 1400") is a radio station broadcasting a classic hits format. Licensed to Fort Morgan, Colorado, United States, the station is currently owned by Media Logic, LLC and features local programming and information from Fox News Radio.

References

External links

FTM
Classic hits radio stations in the United States